Bentley Mulsanne may refer to:

 Bentley Mulsanne (1980–92), a performance luxury car produced by Bentley Motors from 1980 until 1992
 Bentley Mulsanne (2010), a luxury car produced by Bentley Motors from 2010 until 2020